Puya ugentiana is a species in the genus Puya. This species is endemic to Bolivia.

References

ugentiana
Flora of Bolivia